StarSat (formerly TopTV until 31 October 2013) is a South African direct broadcast satellite television service that began broadcasting on 1 May 2010. StarSat is operated by On Digital Media, who were granted a pay-TV license by ICASA in September 2007. On Digital Media is currently 20% owned by Luxembourgish satellite operator SES and 20% owned by Chinese company StarTimes. StarSat's service is aimed at the LSM 6-9 demographic, targeting middle class viewers.

History

On Digital Media (Pty) Ltd launched TopTV on 1 May 2010.

On 30 April 2013, shareholders of On Digital Media voted to approve China-based company StarTimes taking over a 20% share of ODM. By doing so, StarTimes effectively acquired a 65% economic interest in ODM. The vote also included adoption of a business rescue plan.

TopTV was officially rebranded as StarSat on 31 October 2013. The new packages and channels associated with the new brand were made available on 1 December 2013.

Broadcast and Reception
StarSat services are broadcast via satellite, using the SES-5 satellite at the 5° east orbital position, and 3 of the six 36 MHz transponders in the "Sub Saharan Africa Ku-band" beam providing coverage of the whole sub-Saharan Africa region. Transmissions are in the DVB-S2 MPEG-4 digital TV format with reception using a simple set-top box and with the Combo3 PVR decoder launched  in 2011.

Conax is used as conditional access system.

See also
Astra 4A broadcasting satellite
Astra 5°E orbital position
SES satellite operator
Astra satellite family
MX1

References

External links

 On Digital Media website
 StarTimes website

Mass media companies established in 2010
2010 establishments in South Africa
Television stations in South Africa
Television in South Africa
Direct broadcast satellite services
Mass media in Johannesburg